The 2013 Wyoming Cavalry season is the team's fourteenth season as a football franchise and third in the current Indoor Football League (IFL). One of just nine teams competing in the IFL for the 2013 season, the Wyoming Cavalry are members of the Intense Conference. Led by head coach Ryan Lingenfelder, the team plays their home games at the Casper Events Center in Casper, Wyoming.

Off-field moves
For the 2013 season, the Cavalry hired rookie head coach Ryan Lingenfelder to replace longtime head coach Dan "Majic" Maciejczak. Lingenfelder served as defensive coordinator of the Tri-Cities Fever for the previous three seasons.

Shortly before the 2013 season began, the owner of the Cheyenne Warriors died which forced that team to suspend operations and the IFL to revise its schedule to accommodate the now 9-team league. The Cavalry had been scheduled to play two games against the projected in-state rival.

The April 5 game against the Tri-Cities Fever was promoted as Meals on Wheels Drivers & Staff Appreciation Night. The May 3 game against the Colorado Ice was "Feed Casper Night" and Helping the Natrona County Homeless Children. The May 11 game against Tri-Cities was "Fly Casper Night" plus a "Ladies Wine Tasting & Fundraiser" for Crossroads Kitchen. The May 31 home finale versus the Cedar Rapids Titans will be "Breast Cancer Awareness Night".

Roster moves
Barney O'Donnell III, a former St. Ambrose University standout and 2006 Cedar Rapids Gazette Athlete of the Year, joined the Cavalry to start the 2013 season as the team's primary quarterback.

Schedule
Key:

Regular season

Roster

Standings

References

External links
Wyoming Cavalry official website
Wyoming Cavalry official statistics
Wyoming Cavalry at Casper Star-Tribune
2013 IFL regular season schedule

Wyoming Cavalry
Wyoming Cavalry seasons
Wyoming Cavalry